Lucius Domitius Domitianus or, rarely, Domitian III, was a Roman usurper against Diocletian, who seized power for a short time in Egypt.

History 
Nothing is known of the background and family of Domitianus. He may have served as prefect of Egypt before he proclaimed himself emperor, though no known document makes his previous position clear.

Domitianus revolted against Diocletian in 297 AD; it is possible that the rebellion was sparked by a new tax edict, but this is uncertain. Numismatic and papyrological evidence support Domitianus' claim to the purple.

Domitianus died in December of the same year, when Diocletian went to Aegyptus to quell with the revolt. Domitianus' corrector, Aurelius Achilleus, who was responsible for the defense of Alexandria, appears to have succeeded to Domitianus' claim to the empire; in fact, it was only in March 298 that Diocletian succeeded in re-conquering the city.

References

Sources
 DiMaio, Michael, "L. Domitius Domitianus and Aurelius Achilleus (ca.296/297-ca.297/298)", De Imperatoribus Romanis

297 deaths
3rd-century Roman usurpers
3rd-century Egyptian people
Domitii
Tetrarchy
Year of birth unknown